The East-Azerbaijan Provincial Palace is the main office for Iran's East-Azerbaijan provincial governor in downtown Tabriz. The history of the palace goes back to the Safavid and Zand dynasties, when it was named Aali Qapou. The original construction of the palace was supervised by Najaf Qoli Khan for the Safavid kings, when Tabriz was the capital of Iran. During the Qajar era, Aali Qapu served as the residence for the crown prince of Iran. It was reconstructed and repaired under Naser al-Din Shah, during which its name was changed to Shams ol-Emareh. Since the Iranian Constitutional Revolution, the palace has been used as the provincial governorship office.

The main parts of the original building were destroyed in a fire in 1933, which was followed by a major flood. Remaining parts of the original palace were destroyed entirely by the East Azerbaijan governor at the time, Ali Mansur, and a newer building was constructed. The new building which has survived up to now is mostly constructed in Mansur's time in Tabriz as governor.

Part of the state building is open for public visitors.

History

Aali Qapu (1500–1800)

The original building of the Aali Qapu palace was built in the late Safavid era, when Tabriz was capital of the Iranian Empire. This building was built in competition with Ottoman Empire, while two states were sworn enemies of each other. In later years during Afsharid dynasty and Zand dynasty, the palace was used as the palace for local governor of Azerbaijan.

Shams ol Emareh (1800–1933)
With the rise of the Qajar dynasty and with the increase of Tabriz's role in Iranian politics and the leading Qajar Royal Family, the city was chosen as the office of the Crown Prince. A newer section called Haram-khaneh (residence) was constructed next to the palace as the residence of the Prince as well. In period of Naser al-Din Mirza residence, the building was renamed to Shams ol-Emareh, after the eponymous building in Tehran's Golestan Palace. During the Qajar era, many royal ceremonies were held in this building, including the wedding of Prince Etezad ol-Saltaneh.

East Azerbaijan Provincial Palace (1933–present)
Following the fall of the Qajar dynasty and the rise of the Pahlavi dynasty, Tabriz lost its traditional dominant role in Iranian politics, along with its traditional royal importance. The building was then used as the office of the East Azerbaijan governor. In 1933 during Adib-ol-Saltaneh Samei (in Persian: ادیب السلطنه سمیعی), large parts of the building were ruined in a fire. Many people were blamed Samei for his ignorance in the protection of the palace. In 1934 some other parts of the building were destroyed during a major flood. In 1946, Governor Ali Mansur (in Persian: علی منصور), the rest of the remaining parts of the palace were destroyed and a new marble building was constructed instead, which has served as the office of the provincial governor till now. In 1969, the Haram-khaneh building was also destroyed and the city's governor office was built in its place. Local people criticized governors for their ignorance and the destruction of the city's heritages.

Museum
In 2013 a museum titled East Azerbaijan Governorship was established in the building containing the photos of Azerbaijan governors, important documents, memorials and gifts for the governors.

War Heroes Statues
On 2013 statue of six war heroes 
from Iranian Azerbaijan, who were killed in action during Iran Iraq war, were erected in Shohada square, in front of the Provincial Palace. The statues include statue of Javad Fakoori, former commander of IRIAF and Mehdi Bakeri, a commander of volunteer forces

Etymology 
The original name of the building, i.e., Aali Qapu is made of two parts: 'Aali (عالی) which is from Arabic and means 'high, sublime' and Qapu (قاپو) which is from Turkic and means 'door'. This name was also used in the Safavid era for a building in Isfahan.

References

Government buildings in Iran
Tourist attractions in Tabriz
Buildings and structures in Tabriz
Politics of East Azerbaijan Province